Montres Corum Sàrl, commonly referred to as Corum, is a Swiss watchmaker based in La Chaux-de-Fonds, Canton of Neuchâtel. Founded in 1955, it makes high-quality and high-price watches, many of which are limited editions. The benchmark watch series for Corum is its "Admiral's Cup" series. The company is owned by Hong Kong-based Citychamp Watch & Jewellery Group Limited together with Eterna. Both of these Swiss watch companies are managed by a management committee composed by Yeznig Magdhessian, Soon Boon Chong & Maxime Ranzoni.

Corum was also the maker of the World Series of Poker watches that accompanied the World Series of Poker bracelet in 2007, and became the maker of the bracelets themselves in 2007.

History
Corum was founded in La Chaux-de-Fonds, Switzerland by Gaston Ries and his nephew, René Bannwart in 1955. One year later, the first Corum’s watches were being produced. 

Corum's claim to fame came early on when the company introduced a watch made out of a $20 gold coin, which was an instant best-seller. Corum is also known for its "World Premiers". Each year, it has produced a limited number of limited edition pieces.

In January 2000, the arrival of a new owner and President, Severin Wunderman, gave new impetus to Corum.

On 25 June 2008, Severin Wunderman died at the age of 69.

In January 2010, on the eve of the jubilee year for Corum, its founder René Bannwart, died aged 95.

In April 2013, Corum announced that it had been purchased by the China Haidian Holdings Limited group, today called Citychamp Watch & Jewellery Group.

Models

Admiral's Cup

The Admiral's Cup race was first held in 1957 and the Corum Admiral's Cup watch was introduced just three years later in 1960. This first watch was square, water resistant, and had a sailboat engraved on the back. It had little resemblance to the current Corum Admiral's Cup watches with their twelve-sided (Dodecagon) case design and brightly colored nautical pennants decorating the bezels.

The men's Corum Admiral's Cup has been available in 35mm, 37mm, 40mm, 41mm, 44mm, and 48mm sizes as well as in versions with a chronograph complication (by ETA, Frederique Piguet) or with just the time and date.

Ladies versions of the line were available from 26mm, 31mm and 34mm.

Several materials are available as well: rose gold, yellow gold, two tone, stainless steel and a titanium and rubber fusion on the Admiral's Cup Challenge Regatta 2007.

Bubble 
One of Corum's most iconic and recognizable series, produced from the beginning of the 2000s to the end of the decade. In 2015 this line was reintroduced with different materials. Created by the owner of the brand at the time, legendary Severin Wunderman, with a bold design and an unusual huge sapphire glass face - the line was available in three sizes - mini  (26 mm), midsize (35mm) and XXL version of 45mm.

The XXL has had over ten different limited editions, rare and highly sought after. Among them are Lucifer, Baron Samedi, Bats, Joker, Royal Flush, etc.

Buckingham 
Released in the 1960s, the model is still produced. Part of the "dress" line of the brand, the model currently features a square 37mm x 37mm case, equipped with either an alligator leather strap or stainless steel Corum-branded mesh, integrated into the case. The model is available with either a quartz movement or a manually-wound ETA (Peseux) 7001 movement. Some older models are available with automatic movements. Dials use index markers or English/French wording.

Romulus

Created in 1966, the Corum Romulus was the first Corum watch to display the hour numerals on the bezel. It sports a sapphire case back engraved with a laurel crown in honor of Romulus, the founder of ancient Rome. It is available in stainless steel, white or yellow gold and a dual time version in either yellow or white gold. The modern models are available in 40 mm or, more recently, 42 mm cases and leather straps or steel bracelets.

Golden Bridge

The Corum Golden Bridge collection is unique in the watchmaking world. Its four sapphire sides offer an unrestricted view of the intricately detailed linear movement, which appears to be floating in mid-air, held only by the gold bridge that names this watch. The Corum Golden Bridge is offered in 18k gold or platinum, and is also available with delicate diamond work.

Tourbillon and Classical

The Corum Tourbillon and Classical collection comprise the Corum Classical Billionaire Tourbillon, a diamond and sapphire-covered masterpiece of watchmaking, the Corum Golden Tourbillon Panoramique with its tourbillon movement floating between sapphire bridges, and the skeleton-dialed Corum Classical Skylight Skeleton.

Coin Watch

Corum has produced coin watches for one fifty years and have an automatic, manual wind or quartz movement. They are available with a $20 Double eagle, $10 or $5 “Liberty” coin for a dial. They are also available with a diamond bezel.

Artisan Timepieces

The Corum Artisan watch line is defined by beautiful dials depicting wild animals, exotic locales, or even historic scenes, all of them limited edition masterpieces of some of the very few craftsmen left who are familiar with the immensely time-consuming techniques used in these watches.

References

External links
Official website
The company story

Luxury brands
Swiss watch brands
Watch manufacturing companies of Switzerland
Manufacturing companies established in 1955
Design companies established in 1955
Companies based in the canton of Neuchâtel
Swiss companies established in 1955